Agarivorans gilvus is a Gram-negative, non-endospore-forming and agarase-producin, bacterium from the genus of Agarivorans which has been isolated from seaweed from Weihai in China.

References

Bacteria described in 2011
Alteromonadales